Luke Erede Ejohwomu, Adakaji is the Ovie of Abraka Kingdom hails from Ovowodo/Umeghe ruling house. His Majesty was born on 1 June 1936 to the family of Erede Ejohwomu and Aliatete Ejohwomu. Under the watchful eyes of his late but prominent uncle, Patrick Ejohwomu, he commenced his primary school education in 1944 at the Native Authority (N.A.) School, Amai. In 1950, he moved to the N.A. School, Otu-Jeremi; in 1951, he transferred to the Catholic School at Okpara Water Side where he obtained the standard six certificate. In 1952, he gained admission into St. Thomas College, Ibusa from where he obtained Teacher Grade Two Certificate in 1956.

Eager to put his knowledge to the test, Ejohwomu secured a teaching job at Catholic Modern School, Abraka between 1957 and 1958. During this period, he read privately for Ordinary and Advanced Levels of the GCE in order to qualify for admission into the university. By dint of hard work, he passed both examinations in 1958 and 1960 respectively. In October, 1961, he gained admission into the University of Nigeria, Nsukka, to read economics. He obtained a B.Sc. degree in economics in June 1964. On graduating, Ejohwom taught in Urhobo College, Effurun. He taught economics at the Higher School Certificate classes of the college. In September 1968, he was admitted into the University of Ibadan to read for a post-graduate diploma in Librarianship, a course he successfully completed in June, 1969. In 1978, he attended a course at the I.L.O. Advanced Training Centre, located in Turnin, Italy, and obtained a diploma in Training Methodology from that institution the same year.

He served in many ministries and departments in the Bendel State Civil Service. From July 1969 to about June 1981, he served in the cooperative division of the Ministry of Trade and Industry as an assistant registrar, senior assistant registrar and principal assistant registrar and assistant chief registrar of cooperatives. He transferred to the administrative cadre in 1981 and moved to the Ministry of Social Development and Culture and headed the culture division of that ministry. Later, he was deployed to the following local government areas as a chairman Burutu Local Government Area, July 1986 to December 1987, Isoko Local Government Area, July 1989 to December 1990 and Ughelli South Local Government Area, October to December 1991.

On his deployment back to main civil service, he was assigned to the economic matters division of the Military's Governor's Office, Benin City, as its Secretary. In that position, he represented the Governor's Office of the Public Utilities Board as a director. He served in that capacity between 1988 and 1989. From there, he was posted to the Ministry of Agriculture and Natural Resources, Benin City, as a director of finance. During his time there, Ejohwomu looked after the finances of that executive ministry and ensured that government resources were judiciously spent.

When Delta State was created in 1991, he was one of the few civil servants selected by Chief Felix Ibru, the executive governor of the new state, to prepare a programme for its smooth take off. Working with two politicians, Ejohwomu also prepared the plan of activities for the establishment of the Agricultural Development Programme. 
His mommy; muse Roseline had a brilliant career in the civil service of Bendel and Delta State Civil Service before retiring in 1992. He attained the rank of a Substantive Director (Grade Level 16) in the Ministry of Agricultural and Natural Resources, the last Ministry he served in before retiring in 1992. On retirement, he was appointed chairman, National Directorate of Employment, Delta State Chapter, in 1992 by the Executive Governor of Delta State, Chief Felix Ibru.

During those years of dedicated service, he interacted with many traditional rulers in the former Bendel State now Edo/Delta, little realising that he would be one of them in no distant future. Luke Erede Ejohwomu, the
Ovie of Abraka, was appointed to the throne after he was unanimously chosen as Ovie Elect of Abraka Kingdom by his people in accordance with the Bendel State Legal Notice No.99 of 1979 now applicable in Delta State. He was installed according to tradition on 15 March 1994. On 17 April 1995, the Military Administrator of Delta State Group Captain Ibrahim Kefas, FSS, PSC (+) presented him with a Staff of office. 
Easily referred to as a National Ovie; His Majesty's warm relationship with other traditional rulers in the country cumulated in his palace being a meeting point for Ovies, Emirs, Obis, Igwes and Obas from all over Nigeria. Some of these include Emir of Borgu, Dr (Sen) H. Dantoro CON. Kitoro 111, Emir of Ringim, Dein of Agbor, HM Keagboekuzi1, JP, Obi of Owa, HM Obi Dr Emmanuel Efeizomor 11 JP, Igwete of Amai, Eze Monday Ossai.

Following the reign of His Majesty Luke Erede Ejohwomu, Adakaji 1, and the consequent splitting of the Kingdom into two separate kingdom, HRM AVM Lucky Ochuko Ararile (rtd) was enthroned as the Ovie (King) of Umiaghwa-Abraka Kingdom in April 2012.(http://www.frontiersnews.com/abraka-kingdom-elects-avm-ararile-as-new-king/).

Hobbies 
His Majesty listened to classical music and enjoyed the game football and documentary films.

Religion 
He was a Christian (a practicing Catholic and a Knight of St John International, KSJI) St Georges Squad.

Marital status 

His Majesty was married to Her Majesty, Oniemo Elizabeth Eghenure Ejohwomu  (Nee Ohwovoriole) daughter of H.R.H D.G Ohwovoriole, Ugbenu Alaka 11, Ohworode of Olomu Kingdom of blessed memory. The marriage is blessed with children and grandchildren.

Charities 
https://www.facebook.com/Adakaji-1-ROYAL-Foundation-318670812294027/

Membership 
He was a member of the following:
Delta State Council of Traditional Rulers
Ukoko R’Ivie R’Urhobo
Association of Traditional Rulers of Oil Mineral Producing Communities
Rotary Club of Nigeria (Honorary)
South-South Traditional Rulers Forum
Delta State Traditional Council on Nation Development Summit of Traditional Rulers
Knight of St John International (KSJI)
Catholic Men Organisation
St Thomas's Old Boys Association, Ibusa
University of Nigeria Nsukka Alumni Association (Great Lions)
Grand Patron of many unions, social and religious organizations e.g. Catholic Youth Organisation, Abraka Chapter, Abraka both at home and diaspora.

References 

Living people
Nigerian royalty
Year of birth missing (living people)